Alexey Igorevich Barabash (born 12 June 1977) is a Russian actor. He is known for playing the role of Nikiforov in Stalingrad (2013).

Biography
Alexey Barabash was born in Leningrad, Russian SFSR, Soviet Union (now Saint Petersburg, Russia).
In 1997 he graduated from Saint Petersburg University of Humanities, Zinovy Yakovlevich Korogodskii workshop, and was admitted to the troupe of the Saint Petersburg Youth Theater under the direction of Anatoly Praudin.

In 1998, a part of the troupe moved to the Baltic House Festival Theatre, where Anatoly Praudin created an experimental stage.

Career
In 2000, Alexey left the Repertory theater and began a career in cinema, Destructive power 2 (TV Series 2001), Alexey Barabash has appeared in over 75 films.

Filmography

References

External links

 
 

1977 births
Living people
Russian male film actors
Russian male television actors
Russian male stage actors
Male actors from Saint Petersburg
21st-century Russian male actors